Curleywee is a hill in the Minnigaff Hills, a sub-range of the Galloway Hills range, part of the Southern Uplands of Scotland. It is normally ascended with Lamachan Hill as part of a round normally starting from the north or south.

References

Donald mountains
Mountains and hills of Dumfries and Galloway
Mountains and hills of the Southern Uplands